The Bailey-Moyes Dragonfly is an Australian-American two-seats-in-tandem, high-wing, strut-braced, open cockpit, conventional landing gear-equipped ultralight aircraft. The aircraft has been in production since 1990 and was designed as a special-purpose tug for hang gliders and ultralight sailplanes. It is available as a complete aircraft or as a kit for amateur construction. The aircraft has been variously produced by Moyes Microlights, Bailey-Moyes Microlights and currently LiteFlite of Botany, New South Wales, all different iterations of the same company.

Design and development
The Dragonfly was developed in the late 1980s specifically as a hang glider tug for use in flatland areas where hang glider flying, which usually relies on hill launches, was not possible. This role requires an aircraft that can climb quickly at low speed. The aircraft has been successful as a hang glider tug and is also used for livestock mustering in its home country, as well as for recreational flying where STOL capabilities are required.

The aircraft is constructed of bolted 6061-T6 aluminium, with the two seats mounted on a fuselage boom tube that runs from the front rudder pedals to the tail. The landing gear consists of two main wheels on chrome molybdenum steel gear legs and axles, and a tail wheel configuration. The flexible steel axles work as shock absorbers during taxiing and landing. The tail wheel is steerable by means of the rudder pedals. The standard Rotax 582 engine is mounted in pusher configuration behind the wing's trailing edge. The engine's liquid-cooling allows fast descents while towing, without subjecting the engine cylinders to shock-cooling. The wing is supported by a V-strut and jury struts. The wing and tail surfaces are covered in pre-sewn Dacron envelopes. A unique feature is the extended rudder post, which is supported by steel cables from the wings and used as a tow attachment point. The aircraft is equipped with dual controls for pilot training and the rear seat is removable when not needed. The aircraft takes about 200 hours to assemble from the kit.

The design is a Federal Aviation Administration approved special light-sport aircraft, produced by Pitman Air of Red Bluff, California.

Operational history
The Dragonfly has been exported to 12 countries, where it is primarily employed as a hang glider tug.

Variants
Dragonfly
Original model powered by a  Rotax 582 two-stroke powerplant
Dragonfly C
Improved model powered by a standard  Rotax 582 two-stroke engine, with the  Rotax 912UL four-stroke powerplant optional. The BMW 1100S engine can also be used.

Aircraft on display
Massey Air Museum, Massey, Maryland, United States

Specifications (Dragonfly)

See also

References

External links

Photo of a Dragonfly

1990s Australian ultralight aircraft
Moyes Microlights aircraft